Mioawateria vivens is a species of sea snail, a marine gastropod mollusk in the family Raphitomidae.

Description
The length of the shell attains 12 mm.

Distribution
This marine species occurs in the Gulf of Aden.

References

External links
 Morassi, M.; Bonfitto, A. (2013). Three new bathyal raphitomine gastropods (Mollusca: Conoidea) from the Indo-Pacific region. Zootaxa. 3620(4)

vivens
Gastropods described in 2013